Claire Molloy is an Ireland women's rugby union international from Galway. Molloy represented Ireland at the 2010,   2014 and 2017 Women's Rugby World Cups. At the 2014 tournament she was a member of the Ireland team that defeated New Zealand and she captained Ireland at the 2017 tournament. She was also a member of the Ireland teams that won the 2013 and  2015 Women's Six Nations Championships. She is also an Ireland women's rugby sevens international and captained the Ireland team at the 2013 Rugby World Cup Sevens.

Family
Molloy was raised in a sporting family. Claire's father, Evan Molloy, is a prominent member of the Colaiste Iognáid (Jez) Rowing Club. Three of her siblings have also represented Ireland at international level in different sports. Her younger brother, Tim Molloy, is a former Republic of Ireland under-19 association football international and also played for University College Dublin A.F.C. Her sister, Emily Molloy, played as a goalkeeper for the Ireland women's national field hockey team at underage level and her older brother, Liam Molloy, rowed for Ireland up to under-23 level.

Gaelic football
On 30 April 2005 she played in the Ladies' National Football League final which Cork won 2–13 to 0–6. On 25 July 2005 she played in the All-Ireland Under-18 Ladies' Football Championship (minor) final against Donegal which Galway won 5–7 to 1–8. On 2 October 2005 she played in the 2005 All-Ireland Senior Ladies' Football Championship Final which Cork won 1–11 to 0–8  Other members of these Galway teams included Niamh Fahey and Annette Clarke. Molloy played for Galway up to 2011.

Rugby union

Clubs
Molloy switched codes from Ladies' Gaelic football to women's rugby union while attending Cardiff University where she studied medicine. She initially played for Cardiff Quins, making her debut in the WWRU National Cup final which Quins won. She was also a Cardiff Quins player when she made her debut for the Ireland women's national rugby union team. Molloy subsequently joined Bristol Ladies and on summer trips home from university she also played for Galwegians. Together with Sarah Hunter and Carys Phillips, Molloy was one of three Bristol Ladies players to captain their countries at the 2017 Women's Rugby World Cup. Hunter and Phillips captained England and Wales respectively. Molloy moved to Wasps in 2018, before returning to Bristol in 2022

Provincial level
Molloy has represented Connacht in the IRFU Women's Interprovincial Series. She has also played for the Irish Exiles.

Ireland international
On 6 February 2009, Molloy made her debut for the Ireland women's national rugby union team when she came on as replacement in a 7–5 win against France. This was the first time the Ireland Women had beaten France. Molloy went onto represent Ireland at the 2010, 2014 and 2017 Women's Rugby World Cups. At the 2014 tournament she was a member of the Ireland team that defeated New Zealand. She captained the Ireland team at the 2017 tournament, replacing an injured Niamh Briggs. Molloy was also a member of the Ireland teams that won the 2013 and  2015 Women's Six Nations Championships.

Molloy is also an Ireland women's rugby sevens international and captained the Ireland Sevens team at the 2013 Rugby World Cup Sevens. She also represented the Ireland Sevens at the 2013 European Women's Sevens Grand Prix Series and the 2015 Rugby Europe Women's Sevens Championships.

Molloy took a break from international rugby at the start of the 2020 season to concentrate on her medical career. She returned in September 2020 in time for the rescheduled 2020 Women's Six Nations Championship game against Italy.

In the 2021 Women's Six Nations Championship she started against Wales and France but did not make the match-day 23 for the play-off game against Italy.

On 28 September 2021, Molloy announced her retirement from international rugby.

Doctor
Molloy is qualified as a doctor. She studied medicine at Cardiff University, where her classmates included Jamie Roberts. She has worked as an A&E doctor in Abergavenny and at the University Hospital of Wales in Cardiff.

Honours

Rugby union 
Ireland
Women's Six Nations Championship
Winners: 2013, 2015
Grand Slam
Winners: 2013
Triple Crown
Winners: 2013, 2015
Ireland Sevens
Rugby Europe Women's Sevens Championships Plate
Winners: 2013
Cardiff Quins
WWRU National Cup
Winners: 2008 ?
Individual
 2012 Ireland Women's Player of the Year
2017 Guinness  Rugby Writers of Ireland Women's Player of the Year
 2017

Gaelic football 

All-Ireland Under-18 Ladies' Football Championship
Winners: 2005
All-Ireland Senior Ladies' Football Championship
Runners Up: 2005
Ladies' National Football League
Runners Up: 2005

References

1988 births
Living people
Irish female rugby union players
Ireland women's international rugby union players
Ireland international women's rugby sevens players
Alumni of Cardiff University
Galway inter-county ladies' footballers
Rugby union players from County Galway
Connacht Rugby women's players
Ladies' Gaelic footballers who switched code
21st-century Irish medical doctors
Irish Exiles women's rugby union players